The 1991 Spanish local elections were held on Sunday, 26 May 1991, to elect all 66,308 councillors in the 8,060 municipalities of Spain and all 1,032 seats in 38 provincial deputations. The elections were held simultaneously with regional elections in thirteen autonomous communities, as well as local elections in the three foral deputations of the Basque Country and the ten island councils in the Balearic and Canary Islands.

Electoral system
Municipal elections
Municipalities in Spain were local corporations with independent legal personality. They had a governing body, the municipal council or corporation, composed of a mayor, deputy mayors and a plenary assembly of councillors. Voting for the local assemblies was on the basis of universal suffrage, with all nationals over eighteen, registered in the corresponding municipality and in full enjoyment of all political rights entitled to vote. The mayor was in turn elected by the plenary assembly, with a legal clause providing for the candidate of the most-voted party to be automatically elected to the post in the event no other candidate was to gather an absolute majority of votes.

Local councillors were elected using the D'Hondt method and a closed list proportional representation, with an electoral threshold of five percent of valid votes—which included blank ballots—being applied in each local council. Councillors were allocated to municipal councils based on the following scale:

Councillors of municipalities with populations between 100 and 250 inhabitants were elected under an open list partial block voting, with electors voting for individual candidates instead of parties and for up to four candidates. Additionally, municipalities below 100 inhabitants, as well as those whose geographical location or the best management of municipal interests or other circumstances made it advisable, were to be organized through the open council system, in which voters would directly elect the local major.

The electoral law provided that parties, federations, coalitions and groupings of electors were allowed to present lists of candidates. However, groupings of electors were required to secure the signature of a determined amount of the electors registered in the municipality for which they sought election:
At least 1 percent of the electors in municipalities below 5,000 inhabitants, provided that the number of signers was more than double that of councillors at stake.
At least 100 signatures in municipalities between 5,001 and 10,000.
At least 500 signatures in municipalities between 10,001 and 50,000.
At least 1,500 signatures in municipalities between 50,001 and 150,000.
At least 3,000 signatures in municipalities between 150,001 and 300,000.
At least 5,000 signatures in municipalities between 300,001 and 1,000,000.
At least 8,000 signatures in municipalities over 1,000,001.
Electors were barred from signing for more than one list of candidates. Concurrently, parties and federations intending to enter in coalition to take part jointly at an election were required to inform the relevant Electoral Commission within ten days of the election being called.

Deputations and island councils
Provincial deputations were the governing bodies of provinces in Spain, having an administration role of municipal activities and composed of a provincial president, an administrative body, and a plenary. Basque provinces had foral deputations instead—called Juntas Generales—, whereas deputations for single-province autonomous communities were abolished: their functions transferred to the corresponding regional parliaments. For insular provinces, such as the Balearic and Canary Islands, deputations were replaced by island councils in each of the islands or group of islands. For Majorca, Menorca and Ibiza–Formentera this figure was referred to in Spanish as consejo insular, whereas for Gran Canaria, Tenerife, Fuerteventura, La Gomera, El Hierro, Lanzarote and La Palma its name was cabildo insular.

Most deputations were indirectly elected by local councillors from municipalities in each judicial district. Seats were allocated to provincial deputations based on the following scale:

Island councils and foral deputations were elected directly by electors under their own, specific electoral regulations.

Municipal elections

Overall

City control
The following table lists party control in provincial capitals, as well as in municipalities above or around 75,000. Gains for a party are highlighted in that party's colour.

Provincial deputations

Summary

Deputation control
The following table lists party control in provincial deputations. Gains for a party are highlighted in that party's colour.

Notes

References

1991